The 1973 World Table Tennis Championships women's doubles was the 31st edition of the women's doubles championship.
Maria Alexandru and Miho Hamada defeated Chou Pao Chin and Lin Mei Chun in the final by three sets to nil.

Results

See also
List of World Table Tennis Championships medalists

References

-
1973 in women's table tennis